Seneca Park Zoo is a 20-acre (6.3 ha) zoo located in the city of Rochester, New York. The zoo is home to over 90 species including mammals, reptiles, birds, amphibians, fish, and arachnids. It is accredited by the Association of Zoos and Aquariums (AZA). The zoo is operated by Monroe County, with support from the Seneca Park Zoo Society. The zoo opened in 1894 in Seneca Park.

History
Seneca Park, designed by Frederick Law Olmsted, is located on the border of the City of Rochester and the Town of Irondequoit, along the Genesee River. The park was opened in 1893, and animals started being displayed in 1894. The first major addition to the zoo was the Main Zoo Building in 1931. The building was home to a wide variety of animals.

The Seneca Park Zoo Society was chartered as an educational institution by New York State in 1957. Since that time, the Society has evolved into a non-profit organization that supports and promotes the zoo by running educational programs, special events, marketing and public relations efforts, fundraising for in situ wildlife conservation, and food and gift operations. The Society offers memberships that are very popular with area families.

In 1975, a polar bear grotto was opened to house the zoo's two polar bears (Penny and Nickels), who had been acquired using pennies and nickels collected by local school children. In 1993, the zoo opened the $2 million Genesee Trail and Discovery Center—its first landscape immersion exhibit. This was followed in 1997 by the $8.2 million Rocky Coasts exhibit.

On May 17, 2012, the zoo opened A Step Into Africa, which was designed to replicate a portion of the NgoroNgoro Crater in Tanzania. This section of the zoo houses African bush elephants, olive baboons, Southern African lions, and domestic goats.

In 2018, the zoo began making arrangements to demolish the Main Zoo Building as it no longer meets today's standards of animal welfare. On June 2, the zoo opened a Cold Asia portion, featuring a new exhibit for the zoo's snow leopards and bringing in red pandas. During that same year, an extension of A Step Into Africa opened with a new home for the resident southern white rhinoceros, and will feature new animals like Masai giraffes, plains zebras, ostriches, naked mole-rats, rock hyraxes, Lake Malawi chiclids, and many more.

Animal species in collection

Amphibians

African bullfrog
Borneo eared frog
Fire-bellied toad

Hellbender
Marine toad
Mueller’s clawed frog

Panamanian golden frog
Yellow and blue poison dart frog
Yellow-banded poison dart frog

Birds

African penguin
Bald eagle
Buffalo weaver
Congo African grey parrot
Golden-breasted starling

Red-tailed hawk
Rouen (Mallard) duck
Ostrich
Sandhill crane
Senegal parrot
Snow goose

Snowy owl
Speckled mousebird
Spotted dikkop
Superb starling
Taveta golden weaver

Coral

Bubble (or Grape) coral
Button mushroom coral
Candy coral

Frilly mushroom coral
Green leather coral
Hammer coral

Kenya tree coral
Star polyp
Tree leather coral

Fish

Banggai cardinalfish
Diamond goby
Flame hawkfish

Lake Malawi chichlid
Lake sturgeon
Largemouth bass

Ocellaris clownfish
Percula clownfish
Yellow tang

Invertebrates

Jade headed buffalo beetle
Madagascar hissing cockroach
Mombasa golden starburst tarantula

Rose bulb tip anemone
Pacific cleaner shrimp
Peppered cockroach

Rose Tarantula
Short-armed brittle star
Spiny sea urchin

Mammals

African bush elephant
Amur tiger
California sea lion
Canada lynx
Chinchilla
Domestic goat
Domestic rat
Four-toed hedgehog
Gray wolf
Masai giraffe

Naked mole-rat
North American river otter
Olive baboon
Plains zebra
Polar bear
Raccoon
Red panda
Rock hyrax
Snow leopard
Southern African lion
Southern three-banded armadillo
Southern white rhino'

Reptiles

African bush viper
African pancake tortoise
Ball python
Burmese python
Dumeril's ground boa
East African spiny-tailed lizard
Giant day gecko

Great plated lizard
Henkel's leaf-tailed gecko
Madagascar tree boa
New Caledonian crested gecko
Red-eared slider
Spotted turtle
Western rat snake

Exhibits
The Rocky Coasts exhibit opened in 1997. It is an area dedicated to animals of the polar and temperate coastal regions of the world, including African penguins, California sea lions, snowy owls, Canada lynx, and sandhill cranes. The exhibit includes an underwater viewing area which places visitors close to the sea lions swimming behind large glass windows.

A Step Into Africa was unveiled in 2012 and the exhibit includes a replica Maasai hut, Dig Zone for uncovering casts of fossils, interactive learning tools, and a stationary safari bus from which the zoo's African lions can be viewed. The area is home to the zoo's African bush elephants, olive baboons, and (Southern) African lions in naturalistic settings. Seneca Park Zoo is home to the first three African bush elephants in New York State.

The zoo's animal collection changes periodically with AZA recommendations regarding breeding through the Species Survival Plans (SSPs), animal deaths and births. The spring of 2013 proved to be a very fruitful time at the zoo as it welcomed two lion cubs, six African penguin chicks, one golden lion tamarin baby, three domestic goat kids, a California sea lion pup and a Bornean orangutan baby. In 2018, Seneca Park Zoo began its multi-year Master Plan improvement. The first elements of a Cold Asia area opened next to the animal hospital in June, which included new habitats for snow leopards and red pandas. In September 2018, the zoo opened up a new African exhibit called Animals of the Savanna. The five-acre area includes Masai giraffes, plains zebras, a white rhino, naked mole rats, an aviary, and some other smaller exhibits.

Education and conservation

Seneca Park Zoo reaches out to many communities in the Western New York region to educate the public with regards to animal and resource conservation, environmental awareness and recycling programs. The zoo is a popular destination for school field trips and the zoo has created expeditions for schoolchildren to learn specific lessons in a zoo setting. The ZooMobile, sponsored by Wegmans, brings small, transportable animals to places like recreation centers, libraries, festivals, senior living facilities and schools. The Butterfly Beltway program, sponsored by the Daisy Marquis Jones Foundation, is a program aimed at planting butterfly gardens to increase populations of monarch butterflies, vital pollinators in the region. Additional programs such as summer programming, ZooCamp and ZooTeens give the community an opportunity to enjoy first-hand experiences with educators, zoo keepers and animals.

Events

Seneca Park Zoo hosts many events throughout the year including free-with-admission events such as conservation education days and daily 'Summer Experiences' from Memorial Day Weekend through Labor Day. Popular fundraisers include ZooBrew, Zoobilation (annual gala), ZooBoo (Halloween), and Breakfast with Santa. The Jungle Jog 5K race that occurs in July of each year boasts a course that takes runners through Seneca Park and the zoo. This 5K is extremely popular with area runners and families.

References

External links
 

1893 establishments in New York (state)
Zoos in New York (state)
Entertainment venues in Rochester, New York
Culture of Rochester, New York
Zoos established in 1893
Educational buildings in Rochester, New York